Bruce Jouanny (born 11 June 1978 in Paris, France) is a French racing driver.

He started his career in his homeland of France, before moving on to international series. In 2000, he won his only career title to date – the Formula Palmer Audi Junior series. He progressed onwards to Formula Three series around the world, including the British Formula Three Championship. His best series standing in the British version was 4th in 2002.

He then moved on to World Series by Nissan, now known as World Series by Renault, which he participated in the 2003 season, 2004 season and 2006 season. His best series standing was 9th in 2004.

He now participates in the Le Mans Series and the Le Mans 24 hours, with a best 24 Hours of Le Mans ranking of 8th in the 2009 race. He currently drives for Pescarolo Sport in the Le Mans Series.

He is the official car developer and test driver of the Superleague Formula. Bruce is also a world feed commentator of the Superleague Formula and has commentated alongside Ben Edwards and Jonathan Green.

24 Hours of Le Mans results

Complete Formula Renault 3.5 Series results
(key) (Races in bold indicate pole position) (Races in italics indicate fastest lap)

References

External links 
 Driver Database information

1978 births
Living people
Racing drivers from Paris
French racing drivers
French Formula Renault 2.0 drivers
Formula Palmer Audi drivers
British Formula Three Championship drivers
Japanese Formula 3 Championship drivers
24 Hours of Le Mans drivers
European Le Mans Series drivers
World Series Formula V8 3.5 drivers
Carlin racing drivers
OAK Racing drivers
RC Motorsport drivers
KTR drivers
Pescarolo Sport drivers
Team Kunimitsu drivers
Nürburgring 24 Hours drivers
Le Mans Cup drivers